Vicky Kanai is a Palauan politician, who has been a member of the House of Delegates of Palau since 2016. Prior to her election, Kanai served as the Governor of Airai for two terms.

References

Living people
21st-century Palauan women politicians
21st-century Palauan politicians
Members of the House of Delegates of Palau
Year of birth missing (living people)